The Union des Banques Congolaise was a bank based in the Belgian Congo which operated for 86 years before it became bankrupt and in 2006 was merged into the Banque Congolaise.

History
In 1920, the Banque de Bruxelles established the Crédit General du Congo, with its administrative headquarters in Brussels, and its corporate headquarters in Léopoldville. Shortly thereafter, the CGD established branches in Matadi, Elizabethville, and Stanleyville. In 1929, Banque de Bruxelles transferred the operations of CGD to the newly created Banque Belge d'Afrique.  Shortly after the Belgian Congo achieved its independence in 1960, the operations in the Congo became Union Zaïroise de Banques.  

By 1989, the bank's ownership was 25% Banque Bruxelles Lambert, 28% the Government of Zaire, and 48% Societe Financiere pour les Pays d'Outre-mer (SFOM). This Swiss-based holding company had three shareholders - Banque Nationale de Paris with 48%, Dresdner Bank with 26%, and Banque Bruxelles Lambert 26%.

By 1991, Union Zairoise de Banques had 16 offices in Zaire and was the second biggest bank in the country after Banque Commerciale Zairoise. Banque Bruxelles Lambert held 41.5% of its capital, directly and indirectly through SFOM, which was then equally owned by BBL, Deutsche Bank and Banque Nationale de Paris. The Zairean Government held 15% of the capital, a group of private investors another 15%, and the rest was distributed among small investors. 

In 1995, the Zaire government arbitrarily and summarily nationalized the bank, dismissing all its staff.  In 2005, the bank's name changed to Union des Banques Congolaises. However, by then the bank was bankrupt and in 2006, the Banque Congolaise acquired it.

Defunct banks of Belgium
Zaire
Banks established in 1920
Banks disestablished in 2006